Bruno Pietro Pesce Rojas (born January 15, 1979 in Santiago, Chile) is a Chilean naturalized Palestinean former footballer who played as a defender.

Career
Pesce played in Chile for Universidad Católica, Deportes Puerto Montt, Santiago Morning, Coquimbo Unido and Rangers, and in Italy for Andria BAT, Brindisi, Pomigliano and now in Olympia Agnonese.

Personal life
Pesce is of Italian descent through his father, and Palestinian through his mother.

References

External links

1979 births
Living people
Chilean people of Italian descent
Chilean people of Palestinian descent
Footballers from Santiago
Chilean footballers
Chilean expatriate footballers
Citizens of the State of Palestine through descent
Palestinian footballers
Palestine international footballers
Palestinian expatriate footballers
Club Deportivo Universidad Católica footballers
Puerto Montt footballers
Santiago Morning footballers
Coquimbo Unido footballers
Rangers de Talca footballers
Chilean Primera División players
Expatriate footballers in Italy
Chilean expatriate sportspeople in Italy
S.S. Fidelis Andria 1928 players
S.S.D. Città di Brindisi players
A.S.D.C. Pomigliano players
Pol. Olympia Agnonese players
Lega Pro Seconda Divisione players
Serie D players
Association football defenders